Penny Mickelbury (born 1948) is an African-American playwright, short story writer, mystery series writer, and historical novelist who worked as a print and television journalist for ten years before concentrating on fiction writing. After leaving journalism, she taught fiction and script writing in Los Angeles and saw two of her plays (Waiting for Gabriel and Hush Now) produced there. She began writing detective novels with Keeping Secrets, published by Naiad Press in 1994, in the first of a series featuring Gianna Maglione, a lesbian chief of a hate-crimes unit based in Washington D.C. and her lover 'Mimi Patterson', a journalist. Her second series of four books features Carole Ann Gibson, a Washington D.C. attorney, who is widowed in the first book and subsequently runs an investigation agency with Jake Graham, the detective who investigated her husband's death. Her third series features Phil Rodriguez, a Puerto Rican private investigator on the Lower Easter Side of New York City. Mickelbury has also written short story collections and historical novels highlighting the Black experience in America.

Selected plays
Time Out (produced 1989)
Waiting for Gabriel (produced 1991, re-staged 2000)
Warm Robes of Remembrance (1993)
Hush Now (produced 2000)

Novels, short stories, and anthologies

Gianna Maglione novels
Keeping Secrets: a Gianna Maglione Mystery, Naiad Press, 1994
Nights Songs: a Gianna Maglione Mystery, Naiad Press, 1995
Love Notes, Naiad Press, 2002
Darkness Descending, 2005
Death's Echoes, Bywater Books, 2018
You Can't Die But Once, Bywater Books, 2020

Carole Ann Gibson novels
One Must Wait, Simon & Schuster, 1998
Where to Choose, Simon & Schuster, 1999
The Step Between, Simon & Schuster, 2000
Paradise Interrupted, Simon & Schuster, 2001

Phil Rodriguez novels
Two Graves Dug, Five Star Press, 2005
A Murder Too Close, Five Star Press, 2008

Historical novels
Belle City, Whitepoint Press, 2014
Two Wings To Fly Away, Bywater Books, 2019

Short story collections
That Part of My Face: Short Stories, 2016
God's Will and Other Lies: Stories, BLF Press, 2019

Anthologies
Stories included in:
The Mysterious Naiad, ed. Grier and Forrest, Naiad, 1994
Spooks, Spies and Private Eyes: Black Mystery, Crime and Suspense Fiction, ed. Paula L. Woods, Doubleday, 1995
Shades of Black: Crime and Mystery Stories by African-American Authors, ed. Eleanor Taylor Bland, Berkley Prime Crime Press, 2004
Send My Love and a Molotov Cocktail, Gary Phillips and Andrea Gibbons, editors), PM Press, 2011

Awards and recognition
1995 Lambda Literary Award Finalist, Night Songs, Naiad
1998 Residency at the Hedgebrook Women Writers Retreat
2001 Golden Pen Award, National Black Writer's Alliance, for Paradise Interrupted
2001 Prix du Roman d'Adventures from Les Éditions du Masque for the Carole Ann Gibson mystery series
2003 Audre Lorde Estate Grant
2005 Lambda Literary Finalist, Darkness Descending, Kings Crossing
2017 Special Keynote Speaker at the Golden Crown Literary Society conference
2019 Inducted with the Washington Post Metro Seven into the National Association of Black Journalists Hall of Fame
2019 Golden Crown Literary Award Finalist, Death's Echoes, Bywater Books
2019 Independent Book Publisher Award, Bronze winner, Death’s Echoes, Bywater Books
2020 Golden Crown Literary Award Finalist, Two Wings to Fly Away, Bywater Books
2020 Alice B Award and medal for career achievement

References

External links
 Official Author Page for Penny Mickelbury
 African American Book Club
 ‘Conversations’ with Penny Mickelbury on ‘the Paula Gordon show’ website
 Bywater Books: Publisher
 Whitepoint Press: Publisher
 BLF Press: Publisher
 GCLS Presents...The Author's Salon Interview with Penny Mickelbury
 Lez Talk Books Podcast: Penny Mickelbury
 Black Lesbian Literary Collective
 Encyclopedia.com

1948 births
Living people
20th-century American novelists
21st-century American novelists
African-American novelists
American mystery writers
American women novelists
Writers from Atlanta
American women journalists
Women mystery writers
20th-century American women writers
21st-century American women writers
Novelists from Georgia (U.S. state)
20th-century American non-fiction writers
21st-century American non-fiction writers
20th-century African-American women writers
20th-century African-American writers
21st-century African-American women writers
21st-century African-American writers